Jeannette Kawas National Park is a national park located in the municipality of Tela, on the northern Caribbean coast of the Atlántida department of Honduras, established on 4 November 1994. The park covers an area of 781.62 square kilometres and has an altitude of 900 metres. The park was created and is managed by the PROLANSATE foundation (protection of  Lancetilla, Punta Sal and Texiguat).

History 

The park was established on 4 November 1994, originally named Punta Sal National Park. It was created and is managed by the PROLANSATE foundation (protection of  Lancetilla, Punta Sal and Texiguat).

Its name was changed to Jeannette Kawas National Park in honor of Jeannette Kawas, an environmental activist and PROLANSATE president who was murdered on February 6, 1995 for her work trying to keep the palm plantations out of the park.

Jeannette Kawas National Park is part of the Ramsar Convention List of Wetlands of International Importance and was designated as such on March 28, 1995.

Geography 
The park is located in the municipality of Tela, on the northern Caribbean coast of the Atlántida department of Honduras. Located at 15º51'N 087º40'W between longitudes 87º29' and 87º52' west and latitudes 15º42' and 16º00'. It covers an area of 781.62 square kilometres and has an altitude of 900 metres.

Ecosystems 
The park is made up of varied marine, terrestrial and wetlands ecosystems with a large number of species.  These ecosystems include beaches, tropical forests, inundated forests, mangrove forests, lagoons and rivers.

Species

Birds 
 Keel-billed motmot
 Turquoise-browed motmot
 Green-breasted mountain-gem
 Lovely cotinga
 Resplendent quetzal
 Bushy-crested jay
 Blue-crowned chlorophonia
 Lesser ground-cuckoo

Mammals 
 West Indian manatee
 Common dolphin
 White-headed capuchin
 Howler monkey

Fishes 
 Tarpon
 Centropomus
 Gafftopsail catfish

Reptiles 
 American crocodile
 Sea turtle, such as green sea turtle, leatherback sea turtle, hawksbill turtle and the loggerhead turtle
 Green iguana
 Red-tailed boa
 Mexican burrowing snake

Arthropods 
 Caribbean hermit crab
 Golden silk orb-weaver

Plants 
 Acalypha skutchii
 Cappatis truerchkhemii
 Columnea tuerckheimii
 Cordia truncatifolia
 Ormosia macrocalyx
 Phyllanthus elsiae
 Rinorea hummelii
 Salacia impressifolia
 Sida antillensis
 Sida troyana

See also 
La Tigra National park,  Honduras first national park

References

Further reading
PARQUE NACIONAL PUNTA SAL  Ramsar Information Sheet (pdf), Ramsar Sites Information Service (RSIS), 7 September 2011, 25 pages (in Spanish)

External links
 Birds of Honduras.com Robert Gallardo, n.d. 
 profile of Jeanette Kawas National Park Carla Picinich, Department of Natural Resource Ecology and Management, Oklahoma State University, Stillwater, OK, n.d., retrieved 9 March 2016
 Interactive Map of Park INFOHN.COM (Info de Honduras S.A.) 2006
 Fundacion PROLANSATE web site (in Spanish) n.d.

Ramsar sites by countries

National parks of Honduras
Atlántida Department
Ramsar sites in Honduras
Protected areas established in 1988
Central American Atlantic moist forests